Mark Scharf (born September 21, 1956), is an American playwright, actor and teacher. His plays have received readings and productions across the United States and internationally in England, Mainland China, Australia, Canada and Singapore.

Biography
Mark Scharf was born in New Albany, Indiana, but moved while young with his family to Seaford, Delaware, where he lived until graduating from Seaford High School in 1974. Mark then moved to Richmond, Virginia, where he attended Virginia Commonwealth University and began his theatre career as an actor. He left Richmond in 1979 and moved to Charlottesville, Virginia, where he played in two bands, The Motive and then The Monarchs, before enrolling as a graduate student in playwriting at the University of Virginia. While attending U.Va., Mark appeared in several shows produced by the Virginia Players and in two seasons with the Heritage Repertory Theatre.

After receiving his Master of Fine Arts degree in Playwriting in 1984, Mark moved to the DC area where he initially worked as publicity director for The Source Theatre Company. In 2014, Mark moved to Baltimore, MD, where many of his plays premiered at various theatres beginning in 1994. Mark continues to work as a playwright, actor and teacher in the Baltimore/DC area.

Scharf’s plays Off the Grid, The Last Ten, Like White on Rice, Final Respects, and his adaptation of Washington Irving's The Legend of Sleepy Hollow are published by Brooklyn Publishing. His plays Memory Garden, The Machine and his adaptation of Mary Shelley's Frankenstein are published by Pioneer Drama. Three monologues (one male, two female) from Memory Garden and three male monologues from Frankenstein are now published in Male Monologues from Published Plays and Female Monologues from Published Plays– both published by Pioneer Drama. His plays Our Place, Wilderness, Monument,, and Grey Hair and Zits are published by Greenroom Scripts LLC. His plays Fortune's Child, Get Stuffed, Lizard Brains and Keeping Faith are published by Original Works Publishing, and his play Replay is published by Heurer Publishing. His play The Quickening, and his adaptations of H.G. Wells' The Time Machine and The Island of Dr. Moreau are published by Steele Spring Stage Rights. A monologue from Mark’s play The Mean Reds is published in One on One: The Best Men’s Monologues for the Twenty-First Century by Applause Books. Also, a monologue from his play Last Night at the Owl Bar appears in the 2009 The Theatre Audition Book 2 and a monologue from his play The Whispers of Saints appears in the 2011 Volume 3, Young Women's Monologues from Contemporary Plays, both published by Meriwether Publishing, Ltd. His play Dark Matter is published in the October, 2022 issue of Night Picnic Press.

Scharf was a contributing participant in playwriting at the 2014 Sewanee Writers Conference. He also was selected as a Playlab Playwright for the 2010 Great Plains Theatre Conference. His awards include the 2020 Best Play, Male Lead Competition, Southwest Theatre Productions, the 2009 Maryland State Theatre Festival's Award for Best Original Script, the 2008 Robert J. Pickering Award for Playwriting Excellence, the 2006 Arts and Letters Prize in Drama, selected by Gary Garrison, 2nd Place in the Hinton Battle Theatre Lab’s 2005 Reading Works Series, both the 1st Place Best Play and 1st Place Best Production Awards in the 2002 Baltimore Playwrights Festival and five Maryland State Arts Council Individual Artist Fellowships in Playwriting (1989, 1993, 2005, 2015, and 2018).
 
Scharf taught Playwriting at Howard Community College in Maryland in 2015, at the University of Mary Washington in 1994, 2001 and from 2004-2013, and was asked to serve as a Thesis Advisor for the Johns Hopkins University 2005/2006 M.A. in Writing program. He has also served as Playwright-in-Residence for Theatre Virginia’s New Voices for the Theatre and served three terms as Chairman of the Baltimore Playwrights Festival (2003–2006). He served as Playwright-in-Residence for the Twin Beach Players of North Beach, Maryland from 2012 to 2018. Scharf is a member of the Dramatists Guild.

Awards

 Best Play, Male Lead Competition, Southwest Theatre Productions, 2020
 Finalist, Spooky Action Theater’s Impossible Play Series, 2020
 Eugene O'Neill National Theater Conference Semi-Finalist, 2018
 Maryland State Arts Council Individual Artist Award in Playwriting, 2018
 Voted 3rd Place Audience Favorite, 2018 10X10X10 at Fells Point Corner Theatre
 Voted 2nd Place Audience Favorite, 2017 10X10X10 at Fells Point Corner Theatre
 Beverly Hills Theatre Guild Julie Harris Playwright Award Competition Semi-Finalist, 2016
 Voted 2nd Place Audience Favorite, 2016 10X10X10 at Fells Point Corner Theatre
 Finalist, 2016 What If? Playwrights Festival and Competition
 Eugene O'Neill National Theater Conference Semi-Finalist, 2016
 Maryland State Arts Council Individual Artist Award in Playwriting, 2015
 1st Place, The Storefront Theatre's Annual Festival of Ten Minute Plays, 2014
 2012 Todd Mcnerney National Playwriting Contest, Runner-Up
 Eugene O'Neill National Theater Conference Semi-Finalist, 2012
 Eugene O'Neill National Theater Conference Semi-Finalist, 2010
 Playlab Playwright, 2010 Great Plains Theatre Conference
 Finalist, 2010 Theatre Conspiracy's Annual New Play Contest
 Finalist, 2009 Arts and Letters Prize in Drama
 Maryland State Theatre Festival Special Award for Best Original Script, 2009
 Finalist, 2008 Arts and Letters Prize in Drama
 Northern Virginia Theatre Alliance Best Production Original Script, 2008
 Robert J. Pickering Award for Playwriting Excellence, 2008
 1st Place, Sandy Spring Theatre Group One-Act Play Festival 2007
 Eileen Heckart Drama Competition Semi-Finalist, 2007
 Winner of the 2006 Arts and Letters Prize in Drama
 Maryland State Arts Council Individual Artist Fellowship in Playwriting, 2005 
 2nd Place Hinton Battle Theatre Lab, 2005 Readings Works Series
 Best Play, 1st Place, Baltimore Playwrights Festival, 2002
 Best Production, 1st Place, Baltimore Playwrights Festival, 2002
 Best Production, 3rd Place, Baltimore Playwrights Festival, 2001
 Two Awards of Excellence, Baltimore Playwrights Festival, 2000
 Award of Excellence, Baltimore Playwrights Festival, 1999
 Best Production, 1st Place, Baltimore Playwrights Festival, 1998
 Award of Excellence, Baltimore Playwrights Festival, 1998
 Award of Excellence, Baltimore Playwrights Festival, 1997
 Literary Prize, Montgomery Playhouse Black Box New Play Festival, 1995
 Best Original Script, Maryland Community Theatre Festival, 1995
 Best Play, New Works Theatre One Act Play Marathon, 1994
 Best Production, Montgomery Playhouse Black Box New Play Festival, 1994
 Award of Excellence, Baltimore Playwrights Festival, 1994
 Maryland State Arts Council Individual Artist Fellowship in Playwriting, 1993
 New Works Theatre Outstanding Achievement in Playwriting Award 1991-92
 Maryland State Arts Council Individual Artist Fellowship in Playwriting, 1989
 Clay E. Delauney Playwriting Award, 1982
 E. Roger Boyle Playwriting Award, 1982

Major Plays
  ZELDA (1981)
  FIRE IN THE NIGHT (1984)
  THE PRETENDERS    (1985)
  BLOOD SECRET (1986)
  SLOWER DELAWARE (1987)
  PRIVATE BEACHES (1991)
  BELTWAY ROULETTE (1991)
  NO RIDERS    (1992)
  THE JUNG AND THE RESTLESS     (1993)
  LIZARD BRAINS (1994)
  LOVE IN THE AGE OF REAGAN(1995)
  FALLING GRACE  (1995)
  SECOND STAR TO THE RIGHT (1997)
  LIKE WHITE ON RICE (1998)
  THE MEAN REDS (1998)
  FREEFALL (2000)
  THE WHISPERS OF SAINTS(2002)
  WILDERNESS (2003)
  EMPIRES FALL (2004)
  BLUE MERMAID (2005)
  GET STUFFED (2005)
  MEMORY GARDEN (2006)
  LAST NIGHT AT THE OWL BAR(2007)
  KEEPING FAITH (2008)
  OFF THE GRID (2008)
  SCORPIONS (2009)
  REPLAY (2009)
  FORTUNE'S CHILD (2010)
  BEST MAN (2010)
  THE MACHINE (2011)
  HIRED GUN (2012)
  GREY HAIR AND ZITS (2012)
  FRANKENSTEIN (adapted from Mary Shelley's novel) (2012)
  OUR PLACE (2013)
  SOMETHING LESS THAN MURDER (2013)
  THE LEGEND OF SLEEPY HOLLOW (adapted from Washington Irving's story) (2014)
  THE QUICKENING (2015)
  THE ISLAND OF DR. MOREAU (adapted from H.G. Wells' novel) (2015)
  MONUMENT (2015)
  STILL POINT (2016)
  THE STRANDED HOURS (2016)
  QUEEN OF THE AIR: THE LAST TRANSMISSIONS OF AMELIA EARHART (2016)
  THE TIME MACHINE (adapted from H.G. Wells' novel) (2017)
  MAKING TIME (2017)
  NANTICOKE ACRES (2017)
  THE LAST TEN (2018)
  THE MONROE DOCTRINE (2019)
  DARK MATTER (2020)
  RED STAR (A Fantasia on Mayakovsky in the New World) (2021)
  ASSISTED LIVING (2021)
  ANTHONY'S ISLAND (2021)
  LINES OF DESIRE (2022)
  FINAL RESPECTS (2022)
  WINTER (2023)

External links
 Mark Scharf's Website: http://www.markscharf.com/
 Applause Publishers—publishers of ONE ON ONE - THE BEST MEN'S MONOLOGUES FOR THE 21st CENTURY (includes a monologue from Mark's play, The Mean Reds)  http://www.applausepub.com/
 Brooklyn Publishers—publishers of Mark's plays The Last Ten, Off the Grid, Like White on Rice, Final Respects, and his adaptation of The Legend of Sleepy Hollow (http://www.brookpub.com)
 Pioneer Drama—publisher of Mark's award-winning play Memory Garden, his play for young audiences,The Machine , and his adaptation of Mary Shelley's Frankenstein, Male Monologues from Published Plays and Female Monologues from Published Plays (http://www.pioneerdrama.com)
 Heurer Publishing-publisher of Mark's play Replay (http://www.hitplays.com/)
 Original Works Publishing—publisher of Mark's plays Get Stuffed, Lizard Brains, Keeping Faith, and Fortune's Child (http://www.originalworksonline.com/)
 Green Room Press - publisher of Mark's plays Wilderness, Our Place, Grey Hair and Zits, and Monument (https://www.greenroompress.com/default.aspx?pg=fr-a)
 Mark's plays Get Stuffed, Lizard Brains and Keeping Faith and his adaptation of The Island of Dr. Moreau are available on Kindle on Amazon.com: (https://www.amazon.com/dp/B004LZ564U)
 Meriwether Publishing—publishers of THE THEATRE AUDITION BOOK 2 (includes a monologue from Mark's play LAST NIGHT AT THE OWL BAR) and VOLUME 3, YOUNG WOMEN'S MONOLOGUES FROM CONTEMPORARY PLAYS (includes a monologue from Mark's play THE WHISPERS OF SAINTS)(https://www.meriwetherpublishing.com/Default.aspx)
 Steele Spring Stage Rights—publisher of Mark's adaptation of The Island of Dr. Moreau, his adaptation of The Time Machine, and The Quickening (https://www.stagerights.com/)
 Baltimore Playwrights Festival (http://www.baltimoreplaywrightsfestival.com)
 University of Mary Washington - where Mark taught Playwriting (http://www.umw.edu/cas/theatre/)
 Website of Playwrights and their work, select "S" for Scharf (http://www.doollee.com)
 Interview in Insight for Playwrights, Vol. 12 Issue 5 (http://www.baltimoreplaywrightsfestival.org/insight200405.rtf)
 Article on Mark Scharf in the U.Va. Alumni Magazine (http://www.baltimoreplaywrightsfestival.org/UVA%20article.jpg)

1956 births
Living people
20th-century American dramatists and playwrights
University of Virginia alumni
People from New Albany, Indiana
People from Seaford, Delaware